Pluto's Christmas Tree is a 1952 Mickey Mouse cartoon in which Pluto and Mickey cut down a Christmas tree that Chip n' Dale live in. It was the 125th short in the Mickey Mouse film series to be released, and the second for that year. While the chipmunks are usually antagonists of Donald Duck, they have pestered Pluto before, in Private Pluto (1943), Squatter's Rights  (1946) and  Food for Feudin'  (1950).

It is one of the few Disney shorts directed by Jack Hannah not to star Donald Duck, although Donald does make a cameo at the end.

Plot
Mickey Mouse and Pluto are searching for a Christmas tree, while Chip 'n' Dale are looking for acorns in the forest. Once the chipmunks see Pluto, they hit him with acorns and escape as he pursues them. Once Pluto is distracted, they hide in a tree. Mickey chops down that very tree, unaware that the two are in it.

Once they get home, Mickey and Pluto decorate the tree and Pluto admires it, but then he notices a light going on and off and investigates it. Dale, who was playing with the light, mistakes Pluto's nose for another light and twists it, revealing himself to Pluto, who then barks at him. Dale retaliates by throwing down ornaments to distract him. Mickey comes by and takes the ornaments from Pluto, unknowingly hanging one of them on Dale, who Pluto fails to alert Mickey to. Pluto then spots Dale stealing chestnuts and chases him up to the top of the fireplace with Santa candle figures. Dale takes a hat and beard from one of the candle figures as a disguise. Pluto notices the strange figure, but he again fails to expose him to Mickey since Mickey doesn't understand his barks. Frustrated, Pluto knocks the other figures away except Dale. Chip then notices from the tree what is going on. He rescues Dale and heads for the tree. Pluto briefly gets his feet stuck in presents as he gives chase, and has difficulty following the chipmunks up the ladder. As Pluto barks at the chipmunks, they cause the ladder to fall and drop the star on top of the tree onto Pluto's tail. While the chipmunks laugh in victory, Pluto, finally pushed beyond his patience, angrily dives into the tree to attack the chipmunks.

Mickey notices Pluto and tries to pull him out, but gets pulled in instead until the tree is stripped of its decorations and leaves. Mickey scolds Pluto for what he did, but notices Chip and Dale with only a few decorations and all of the branches bare, finally realizing what's really going on. Pluto starts barking at the chipmunks for the trouble they caused until Mickey tells him to stop, saying that it's just the holidays. At the window they see Donald Duck, Goofy and Minnie Mouse singing "Deck the Halls". While Mickey and Pluto's friends are singing, Chip and Dale join in, and then Pluto howls in as well, much to the chipmunks' irritation. They then respond by placing a sticker over Pluto's mouth that reads "DO NOT OPEN TIL XMAS".

Cast
Jimmy MacDonald as Mickey Mouse and Chip
Pinto Colvig as Pluto and Goofy
Ruth Clifford as Minnie Mouse
Clarence Nash as Donald Duck
Dessie Miller as Dale

Credits
Direction: Jack Hannah
Animation: George Kreisl, Fred Moore, Bill Justice, Volus Jones
Storyboards: Bill Berg, Milt Schaffer
Layout: Yale Gracey
Background: Thelma Witmer
Music: Joseph S. Dubin

Other uses
Scenes from this cartoon would be used for Disney's Very Merry Christmas Songs. It would be used for "Deck the Halls" and "Let It Snow! Let It Snow! Let It Snow!". "Deck the Halls" would use scenes from this cartoon only and "Let It Snow! Let It Snow! Let It Snow!" only uses a small part from this cartoon. Scenes would also be used for other Disney collections, including A Disney Christmas Gift.

Scenes from this cartoon along with scenes from Mickey's Christmas Carol were also set to D-TV's video of Brenda Lee's "Rockin' Around the Christmas Tree".

A book published in 1954 from Little Golden Books called Donald Duck's Christmas Tree has the same plot as this cartoon but with Donald Duck instead of Mickey Mouse.

The Encyclopedia of Walt Disney's Characters mistakenly credits Horace Horsecollar and Clarabelle Cow, as appearing in this cartoon.

Home media
The short was released on May 18, 2004 on Walt Disney Treasures: Mickey Mouse in Living Color, Volume Two: 1939-Today.

Additional releases include:
A Walt Disney Christmas (VHS)-1981/1986
Mickey's Magical Christmas: Snowed in at the House of Mouse (VHS) 2001/(DVD) 2001, 2009 (Cartoon is a segment in the film)
Walt Disney's Classic Cartoon Favorites Volume 9: Classic Holiday Stories (DVD) 2005
Walt Disney Animation Collection: Classic Short Films Volume 7: Mickey's Christmas Carol (DVD) 2011
Mickey's Christmas Carol 30th Anniversary Edition (DVD, Blu-ray), 2013
Disney+ (streaming), 2019
 Olaf's Frozen Adventure (Blu-ray/DVD/Digital HD), 2018

See also
Mickey Mouse (film series)
 List of Christmas films

References
Citations

Bibliography

External links

1952 animated films
1952 films
American Christmas films
Animated Christmas films
1950s Disney animated short films
Films directed by Jack Hannah
Films produced by Walt Disney
Mickey Mouse short films
Pluto (Disney) short films
Donald Duck short films
Goofy (Disney) short films
Films scored by Joseph Dubin
RKO Pictures animated short films
1950s Christmas films
1950s English-language films
Chip 'n' Dale films